Mangalore Electricity Supply Company Limited (abbreviated as MESCOM) is an Indian electricity supplier to the districts of Karnataka namely Dakshina Kannada, Udupi district, Chickmagalur and Shimoga. It has its headquarters at Mangaluru. The company was formed on June 2002.

Karnataka Electricity Board (KEB) which was earlier involved in Transmission & Distribution of electricity in state of Karnataka was corporatised into Karnataka Power Transmission Corporation Limited (KPTCL).

Later distribution wing was carved out of this company & five companies were formed to cater distribution of electricity to different regions of Karnataka state. Initially four entities were formed first namely MESCOM, BESCOM, HESCOM and GESCOM. Later CESCOM was carved out of MESCOM in 2005 to cater electricity consumers of Mysore region.

Currently KPTCL looks after only Transmission and the Electricity Supply Companies (ESCOM's) look after distribution. The distribution of electricity to last mile or end users is done by this Electricity Supply Companies (ESCOM's) in the state of Karnataka. The electricity generated by Karnataka Power Corporation Limited and other producers is distributed by these ESCOM's.

MESCOM tried an idea of using drones to put electricity supply lines across a river Kumaradhara and was successful. It has 22,61,785 consumers, 755.66 kilometre length of 33 Kilovolt (KV) electric power line and 34,507.71 kilometre length of 11 Kilovolt (KV) line as of November 2017.

The electricity bills of MESCOM can be paid online by its customers. As Mangalore Electricity Supply Company Limited supplies electricity to high rainfall region of India, It suffers extensive damage to its infrastructure, properties during  Southwest monsoon season in the months of June, July, August, September every year.  Shri kishor kumar B has taken charge as new mescom director of mangalore in december 2020.

See also

Solar power in India
Karnataka Power Corporation Limited

References

External links
Mangalore Electricity Supply Company Limited
Twitter
Facebook

Electric power distribution network operators in India
Companies based in Mangalore
Energy in Karnataka
State agencies of Karnataka
State electricity agencies of India
Energy companies established in 2002
2002 establishments in Karnataka